Oversland is a settlement in the Swale district of Kent, England. It is in that of the civil parish of Boughton under Blean.